This is a list of properties and districts listed on the National Register of Historic Places in New Jersey. There are more than 1,700 listed sites in New Jersey. Of these, 58 are further designated as National Historic Landmarks. All 21 counties in New Jersey have listings on the National Register.



Current listings by county

The following are approximate tallies of current listings in New Jersey on the National Register of Historic Places. These counts are based on entries in the National Register Information Database as of April 24, 2008 and new weekly listings posted since then on the National Register of Historic Places web site. There are frequent additions to the listings and occasional delistings and the counts here are approximate and not official. New entries are added to the official Register on a weekly basis.  Also, the counts in this table exclude boundary increase and decrease listings which modify the area covered by an existing property or district and which carry a separate National Register reference number. The numbers of NRHP listings in each county are documented by tables in each of the individual county list-articles.

See also
Operating Passenger Railroad Stations Thematic Resource
 List of National Historic Landmarks in New Jersey
 List of bridges on the National Register of Historic Places in New Jersey

References

External links

New Jersey
 
Tourism in New Jersey